Closed for the Season may refer to:

 Closed for the Season (film), a 2010 supernatural thriller film
 Closed for the Season (novel), a 2009 novel by Mary Downing Hahn
 "Closed for the Season", a song by the Hives from the album Barely Legal